Welco Corners is a populated place in northern Will County, Illinois.
It is at the junction of Interstate 55 and Joliet Road, and is within the city limits and postal delivery zone of Bolingbrook, Illinois, though it existed before the founding of Bolingbrook.

History 
Welco Corners was an important highway junction between historic U.S. Route 66, which bypassed Joliet, and historic Alternate U.S. Route 66, which went through Joliet.  It featured a truck stop and other traveler services.  The community took its name from the Welco truck stop.  Welco Corners remains a landmark for those following old Route 66, and it is still shown on some maps.

Today 

Today,  the truck stop is no longer in business, having been left stranded with no easy access when I-55 was built. A truck repair shop remains, and the former truck stop's parking lot is rented out for truck parking. The area has become a major center for warehousing and other light industry. Other notable businesses in the Welco Corners area include Montana Charlie's Flea Market, which can be crowded on weekends in good weather.  Further south on the edge of  Romeoville is White Fence Farm, which has served travelers on historic U.S. Route 66 since the early 1920s.

References 

Populated places in Will County, Illinois